Canan Kaftancıoğlu (born 3 February 1972) is a Turkish physician and politician. She is the president of the Republican People's Party's (CHP) in Istanbul. In September 2019, she was sentenced to 9 years and 8 months imprisonment for insulting the president and terrorism related charges but after an appeal by the CHP, the Court of Cassation reduced her sentence to over 4 years and 11 Months in May 2022. The Turkish government under President Recep Erdoğan's administration put her on trial for tweeting about the Armenian genocide and assassinations of the three female members of the Kurdistan Workers Party (PKK) in Paris. Her trial came in the wake of her party's victory in regional elections in Istanbul. During her trial she read out a poem by Nazim Hikmet.

Early life 
Kaftancıoğlu was born in the village of Çiftlik Sarıca, Mesudiye, Ordu, the second child in her family. Her father was a primary school teacher and her mother was a housewife. After completing her primary, secondary, and high school education in Ordu, she graduated from Istanbul School of Medicine in 1995. She completed her residency with the thesis "Forensic Medical Evaluation of Torture Cases", which she developed by screening cases reported by the Human Rights Foundation of Turkey.

Political career
Between 2011–2012, she served as the Vice President of the Republican People's Party (CHP) in Istanbul. She was responsible for  press, culture, and communication affairs. She later worked as the party's Provincial Representative between 2012–2014. In the 2014 elections, she was one of the candidate's for Maltepe's mayorship. In the 36th Ordinary Provincial Congress of CHP Istanbul held on 13 January 2018, she was elected as the party's Istanbul Provincial President.

After Kaftancıoğlu became the CHP's Istanbul Provincial President, an investigation was opened about her various posts on social media, which critics described as supportive of terrorism, offensive to the Turkish people, public officials and the President Recep Tayyip Erdoğan and his family. While the posts caused tension between her and Erdoğan, statements supporting Kaftancıoğlu came from the Peoples' Democratic Party as well as her own party. She eventually apologized to Erdoğan for her posts, but repeated her admiration for the PKK's founding members. A prison sentence of 9 years, 8 months and 20 days was ratified on 23 June 2020.

She was among the founders of the Social Memory Platform. She wrote a book. titled Benim Babam Bir Kahramandı, which was published in 2009. She is on the organizing committee of the Ümit Kaftancıoğlu Story Competition. She is a member of the United June Movement Steering Committee.

2020 she spoke in solidarity with the protest 2021 Boğaziçi University protests and was called by Erdogan a terrorist of the Revolutionary People's Liberation Party/Front. This led to a criminal complaint against the president by Kaftancıoğlu.

Legal prosecution 
After the CHP appealed the verdict over 10 years at the Court of Cassation, the court reduced the sentence to 4 years 11 months and 20 days in May 2022.

Personal life 
When she was working as an emergency doctor at the Suşehri Public Hospital, she met Dr. Ali Naki Kaftancıoğlu. They married in 2001. Kaftancıoğlu is the son of assassinated writer Ümit Kaftancıoğlu. The couple has a daughter named Çağım Işık.

References 

1972 births
21st-century Turkish physicians
21st-century Turkish women politicians
Living people
Istanbul University Faculty of Medicine alumni
People from Mesudiye
20th-century Turkish physicians